Jalal Haji Zawar was a former Iranian Defence Ministry contractor. He was executed for spying for the United States.

Controversy 
Zawar was condemned by Tehran’s military court after several meetings and was sentenced to death. He was executed at the Rajayi Shahr prison in Karaj, west of Iran's capital, Tehran.

Zawar's employment was terminated in 2010. He had been detained on account of espionage against the Ministry of Defense's intelligence unit. During the investigation, detectives found espionage tools in his home. Zawar confessed to his crime during his court meeting and claimed to have received money from the CIA in exchange for spying and transferring data and classified information from the Iranian military system to the CIA.

Personal life 
Zawar's ex-wife was convicted of "involvement in espionage" and was sentenced to 15-years in prison.

See also
Military intelligence
Espionage
Murtaja Qureiris
Iran's 2018 prisoner swap proposal to the United States
Walid Fitaihi

References 

 
 
Government officials convicted of crimes
People executed for treason against Iran
21st-century executions by Iran
2019 deaths
People convicted of espionage in Iran
Year of birth missing